Tantaliana signifera is a moth in the family Eupterotidae. It was described by Francis Walker in 1855. It is found in Sierra Leone.

References

Moths described in 1855
Janinae